Uma Família Açoriana (lit. An Azorean Family) is a Portuguese period television series broadcast by RTP. It first aired on RTP1 from 13 October 2013 to 1 December 2013.

Plot
The series begins in 1876 and is set in the Azores.

Cast
Nicolau Breyner as Vasco Ataíde Camara
Maria João Luís as Maria Isabel
Nuno Gil as Pedro
Duarte Guimarães as António
Maria Leite as Margarida
Catarina Wallenstein as Rose
Frederico Amaral as Arthur Salgado
Carlos Santos
Manuel Wiborg
Maria d´Aires
Adriano Carvalho
Agnelo Meneses
Hugo Tavares
Emanuel Macedo
João Maria Pinto

References

2013 Portuguese television series debuts
2013 Portuguese television series endings
Period family drama television series
Portuguese period television series
Rádio e Televisão de Portugal original programming
Television series set in the 19th century
Television shows set in the Azores
2010s Portuguese television series